Michael Theo (formerly Theoklitos) (born 11 February 1981) is an Australian goalkeeper who is the goalkeeping 
coach at A-League club Western United FC.

Career

Early career
Theoklitos began his career as a young lad playing in the Victorian Premier League (VPL) for Bulleen Zebras. He was then picked up by South Melbourne FC but failed to make an impact ahead of number 1 Eugene Galekovic. After 5 appearances for Hellas, he was sold to the Football Kingz FC  for the 2001–2002 season where he became a fan favourite making 20 appearances in the National Soccer League.  During his time with the Kingz he was scouted by Blackpool FC who signed him in 2002.  Due to injury he only played in three games, only two of which counted as full representation for Blackpool.  He returned to Australia where he rejoined Bulleen. While playing for them in the 2004 VPL final, he saved three of four penalties to help Bulleen to victory.

Melbourne Victory

He joined Melbourne Victory FC for their inaugural season in the 2005/06 A-League. In the 2006/07 A-League season, Theoklitos kept ten clean sheets from 21 games, attracting interest from both the Australia and Greece national associations. He has not made a senior appearance for either country.

In the 2008/09 season, Theoklitos was part of Melbourne Victory's grand-final success, keeping five clean sheets at the end of the season. He earned another call-up to the Australian national squad for the match against Kuwait on 5 March 2009, but did not play.

In May 2009, Theoklitos declined a contract extension. In July 2009, it was confirmed that he would be leaving Melbourne Victory, with his contract expiring on 30 July. In early July 2009, he signed a two-year contract with English League One side Norwich City.

Norwich City
In the opening match of the season on 8 August 2009, Theoklitos made his debut for Norwich against Colchester United at Carrow Road, conceding five goals before half-time and seven in total. He described the match as "the worst performance I've had in my career" to BBC Radio Norfolk. Despite the performance, Theoklitos still had the support of manager Bryan Gunn, a former goalkeeper himself. However, Gunn did not have the support of the Norwich board, and was replaced by Colchester manager Paul Lambert, who had engineered the 7–1 defeat. Under Lambert, Theoklitos was demoted to third-choice goalkeeper.

He was recalled to the first-team bench for a Football League Trophy match against Gillingham, but according to the club he failed to show up for the match, causing the club to discipline him. Theoklitos denied the claim, saying "It's not that I did not turn up but I was half an hour late" because "I got my wires mixed up".

Lambert confirmed in December 2009 that he expected Theoklitos to be leaving the club. Theoklitos' contract was terminated by mutual consent in March 2010. His debut was the only game he played for the Canaries.

Brisbane Roar
On 14 March 2010, Theoklitos signed with the Brisbane Roar on a three-year deal. He made his debut in round one of the A league season against Gold Coast United, in a 0–0 draw.
Theoklitos registered a second clean sheet against Sydney FC in round two.

Following the 3–0 loss to Melbourne Victory, Theoklitos had gone 876 minutes without conceding a goal, setting a new record for the most minutes without conceding a goal in an Australian League—beating former recordholder Jeff Olver's record of 790 minutes. Theoklitos won the Goalkeeper of the Year award for the 2010/11 A-League season.

Prior to the 2014/15 season, Theo sustained a wrist injury in pre-season training which ruled him out for half of the season. Theo returned after the January Asian Cup break with a 3–2 home win against the Wellington Phoenix, despite conceding a foolish goal which was credited to Kenny Cunningham. Theo went on to play 3 more matches that season, keeping a clean sheet against the Central Coast Mariners, before injuring his quad muscle.

On 27 March 2018, it was announced that Theo's contract with the Roar would not be renewed after the 2017–18 A-League.

International career
Although selected by Australia on two occasions, Theoklitos has yet to make an appearance for the Socceroos. Of Greek ancestry, he has also received interest from Greece's national association, but so far has only featured for Australia.

Career statistics

CS = Clean Sheets

1 – includes A-League final series statistics
2 – AFC Champions League statistics are included in season ending during group stages (i.e. ACL 2012 and A-League season 2011–12 etc.)

Personal life
Theoklitos was born in Melbourne, Australia and is of Greek ancestry.

The Michael Theo Soccer Academy was established in 2010, running annual clinics during the July school holiday period.

Theoklitos married Victoria Curtis in April 2011 and separated in 2019.

On 1 August 2012 Theoklitos announced that he had changed his name by deed poll to Michael Theo. He said of the change:

Honours
Current as at 15 March 2017

With Melbourne Victory:
 A-League Championship (2):  2006–2007, 2008–2009
 A-League Premiership (2):   2006–2007, 2008–2009
With Brisbane Roar:
 A-League Premiership (2): 2010–2011, 2013–2014
 A-League Championship (3): 2010–2011, 2011–2012, 2013–2014
Personal honours:
 A-League Goalkeeper of the Year (3): 2006–2007, 2007–2008, 2010–2011
 Most minutes (876) not conceding a goal in an Australian League (With Brisbane Roar, 2010–11)
 Third Most clean sheets (68) in A-League history.
 A-League All Star: 2013

References

External links
 Brisbane Roar profile
 Oz Football profile
 Michael Theo Soccer Academy

1981 births
Australian people of Greek descent
A-League Men players
English Football League players
South Melbourne FC players
Blackpool F.C. players
Melbourne Victory FC players
Brisbane Roar FC players
Whittlesea Zebras players
Association football goalkeepers
Football Kingz F.C. players
National Soccer League (Australia) players
Norwich City F.C. players
Australian expatriate soccer players
Soccer players from Melbourne
Living people
Australian soccer players
Australian expatriate sportspeople in England
Australian expatriate sportspeople in New Zealand
Expatriate footballers in England
Expatriate association footballers in New Zealand